The Petroleros de Cabimas was a baseball club that played from 1991 through 1995 in the Venezuelan Professional Baseball League. The Petroleros joined the league as an expansion team in the Western Division and played its home games at Estadio Víctor Davalillo in Cabimas, a town on the shore of Maracaibo Lake in Zulia State.

The Petroleros performed poorly during their four seasons in the league, always ending last in the four-team Western Division, and never reached the playoffs.

The Cabimas team withdrew in 1995 and was replaced by the Pastora de Occidente in the 1995–1996 tournament.

Yearly Team Records

All-time roster

Paul Abbott
Andy Ashby
Cliff Brantley
Jim Bullinger
Terry Burrows
Steve Carter
Jeff Cirillo
Jamie Dismuke
Angel Escobar
Joe Hall
Jonathan Hurst
John Johnstone
Jimmy Kremers
Ced Landrum
Danilo León
Jamie McAndrew
Robert Machado
Quinn Mack
John Massarelli 
Scott May
Matt Maysey
Lipso Nava
Tomás Pérez
Len Picota
Fernando Ramsey
Laddie Renfroe
Argenis Salazar
Bob Sebra
Gary Scott
Steve Sparks
Kelly Stinnett
Scott Taylor
George Tsamis
Tim Unroe
Eduardo Zambrano

Sources
Gutiérrez, Daniel; Alvarez, Efraim; Gutiérrez (h), Daniel (2006). La Enciclopedia del Béisbol en Venezuela. LVBP, Caracas. 
Gutiérrez, Daniel; González, Javier (1992). Numeritos del béisbol profesional venezolano (1946-1992). LVBP, Caracas.

External links
La Historia del Béisbol en el Zulia (I) (Spanish)
La Historia del Béisbol en el Zulia (II) (Spanish)
PuraPelota.com – Petroleros de Cabimas
es.Wikipedia.org – Historia del béisbol en Venezuela
es.Wikipedia.org – Liga Venezolana de Béisbol Profesional
es.Wikipedia.org – Petroleros de Cabimas

1991 establishments in Venezuela
Cabimas
Defunct baseball teams in Venezuela
Baseball teams established in 1991
Zulia